The Festival des cinémas indiens de Toulouse/Toulouse Indian Film Festival is a film festival held annually in Toulouse, France since 2013. As its name indicates it is dedicated to introducing the public to Indian cinema.

History
The idea was floated in 2012 by a group of non-profit organisations and the first edition was held in early 2013 under the name ‘Indian Season’. It was rechristened to its present name in 2015.

The first edition of the Festival was held in 2013. An Audience Choice Award was instituted in the fourth edition, in 2016. A jury award was added for the sixth edition, in 2018. Starting from the seven edition, in 2019, the critics choice award would be set up the Film Critics Circle of India.

The festival was founded by Frédérique Lien Vanessa Bianchi.

Awards

2016
Audience Choice Award – Parched

2017
Audience Choice Award – Vaagai Sooda Vaa and Onaatah

2018
Audience Choice Award – Western Ghats /Merku Thodarchi Malai and Newton
Jury Award – Newton

2019
The members of the 2019 critics jury  are Baradwaj Rangan (chair), Dalton L, Deepa Gahlot, Gautam Kaul, Johnson Thomas, Ratnottama Sengupta, and Utpal Datta. The palmares is: 
Jury prize for feature film: Ee.Ma.Yau by Lijo Jose Pellissery
Jury prize for short film: Unlock by Niru Nadarajah
Jury special mention: Doitto by Tathagata Gosh
Jury special mention: Pariyerum Perumal by Mari Selvaraj
Audience award: Pariyerum Perumal by Mari Selvaraj
FCCI Award for Best Debut Film: Pariyerum Perumal by Mari Selvaraj

References

External links
Official website

Indian film festivals
Film festivals in France